Rattlesnake Creek is an approximately 95 mile stream that is a tributary to the Arkansas River in central Kansas. The head of the stream is in northern Kiowa County and it flows northeast through Edwards and Stafford Counties before converging with the Arkansas River in Rice County. The stream flows through Quivira National Wildlife Refuge dividing the refuge in half. The stream was officially named Rattlesnake Creek in 1971 by the Department of Interior; before 1971 it was called either Rattlesnake Creek, Salt Creek, or West Fork Rattlesnake Creek.

See also
List of rivers of Kansas

References

Rivers of Kansas
Rivers of Rice County, Kansas
Rivers of Stafford County, Kansas
Rivers of Edwards County, Kansas
Rivers of Kiowa County, Kansas
Tributaries of the Arkansas River